Paweł Wojciechowski (born April 30, 1984 in Zielona Góra) is a Polish defender who plays for German club SV Eintracht Elster.

Career

Club
Youth career began in the LSPM Zielona Góra. Senior career began in Lech/Zryw Zielona Góra, after the team performed under the name of Lech Zielona Góra. He later moved to Górnik Zabrze. In the three years spent in Zabrze, he played 34 matches and scored 1 goal. Then represented the colors of Cracovia. After 3 years spent there, he played 17 events. Later he moved on to round Polonia Bytom autumn, playing in 10 games. Round spring is not spent in any club. But the next season he spent in Lechia Zielona Góra. He was tested by Widzew Lodz, but moved to Gorzów Wielkopolski.

In May 2011, he joined Olimpia Elbląg.

References

External links
 

1984 births
Living people
Polish footballers
Polish expatriate footballers
Association football defenders
Górnik Zabrze players
MKS Cracovia (football) players
Polonia Bytom players
Stilon Gorzów Wielkopolski players
Olimpia Elbląg players
People from Zielona Góra
Sportspeople from Lubusz Voivodeship
Polish expatriate sportspeople in Germany
Expatriate footballers in Germany